is a railway station in the city of Hirosaki, Aomori Prefecture, Japan, operated by the private railway operator, Kōnan Railway Company

Lines
Matsukitai Station is served by the Kōnan Railway Ōwani Line, and lies 8.4 kilometers from the southern terminus of the line at Ōwani Station.

Station layout
The station has one side platform serving a single bi-directional track. There is no station building, but only a weather shelter on the platform. The station is unattended.

Adjacent stations

History
Matsukitai Station was opened on January 26, 1952, with the opening of the Ōwani Line.

Surrounding area
Shoeikai Matsuba Nursery

See also
 List of railway stations in Japan

External links

Kōnan Railway home page 
Location map 

Railway stations in Aomori Prefecture
Konan Railway
Hirosaki
Railway stations in Japan opened in 1952